Thenkasipattanam is a 2000 Indian Malayalam-language action comedy film written and directed by Rafi Mecartin, produced by  Lal, and starring Suresh Gopi, Lal and Dileep as male leads and Samyuktha Varma, Geethu Mohandas and Kavya Madhavan as female leads with Salim Kumar and Spadikam George in supporting roles.

Plot 
Kannan and Dassan are owners of the market in their village in Thenkasi Pattinam. They become the famous rowdies under the guidance of their godfather. Dassan has a sister called Devootty who is the educated girl and wants to get rid of their rudeness from their behaviour. Shatrugnan (shortened as Shathru) who later joined as the manager of the KD & Co who is regularly beaten by them due to his stupidity. Soon later it is revealed that Shathru is in love with their sister, but she is not interested in him. He joins Kannan's and Dasan's firm KD & Company as the manager in an attempt to win Devootty's love and her brothers. She enquires about his coming to their village and he says he wanted to marry her. She neglected it saying that first she need to make her brothers marry and to have a family life. To make her  happy, Shathru decides to find the brides for Dassan and Kannan.Meenakshi is the childhood friend of Kannan, who is their enemy's daughter. Meenakshi tries to prove her love and Kannan does not reciprocate it because he knows that Daasan won't accept this relationship.

Once KD & Co keeps as hostage a music troupe who comes to their village to perform. The main singer of that troupe, Sangeetha, gets expelled from her home because of this, so Kannan and Dasan gives her refuge upon Devootty's insistence. Shathru plans to unite  Dassan and Sangeetha.

Soon, Kannan asks Dassan for the marriage with Meenakshi for him, but Dasan mistakenly understands Meenakshi as his bride. On the other hand, Sangeetha is in love with Kannan.

After some fights, Dassan and Kannan bring Meenakshi to their home, and starts wedding preparation. Soon Shathru realises his mistake and wants to change the brides to their respective grooms. When the truth is revealed, Dassan who is madly in love with Meenakshi, forces her in a marriage with him, Kannan who is badly beaten by Dassan. Devootty tries to stop this which leads Dasan to beat her. This provokes Kannan and he fights Daasan.Dasan falls down and kannan says him he is ready to give up his love for his friendship. Dasan changes his mind, allows Kannan and Meenakshi to unite. Sangeetha is ready to marry Dassan.

Cast
 Suresh Gopi as Kannan , owner of KD & company . Closest friend of Dasan. Love interest of Meenakshi. 
 Lal as Dasan , owner of KD & company . Close friend of Kannan . Falls for Meenakshi due to some misunderstanding. Brother of Devootty
 Dileep as Shathrughnan, employee of KD company. College mate of Devootty. Fall for Devootty
 Samyuktha Varma as Meenakshi , love interest of Kannan , whom she reciprocates , and Dasan. Also, Daughter of Devarajan
 Geethu Mohandas as Sangeetha , singer of the troupe captivated by Kannan & Dasan. Falls for Kannan under some misunderstandings.
 Kavya Madhavan as Devootty, sister of Dasan and Kannan . Love interest of Shatru .
 Salim Kumar as Muthuraman, a bullock cart driver in Thenkashi whom Shatru befriends.
 Spadikam George as Devarajan, rich man in Thenkasi , who is rivalry of Kannan & Dasan .
 T. P. Madhavan as Santhosh, Sangeetha's uncle
 Machan Varghese as Karavettan
 Kochu Preman as Rangaraj, Devarajan's right hand
 Usharani as  Sangeetha's aunty
 Manka Mahesh as Maheshwari Amma
 Vinu Chakravarthy
 Narayanankutty
 Bindhu Krishna
 Sajitha Betti as Meenakshi's younger friend
 Dimple Rose
 Manjima Mohan as Young Devootty

Soundtrack 
The film's soundtrack contains 7 songs, all composed by Suresh Peters, with lyrics by Kaithapram Damodaran Namboothiri.

Box office
The film was a commercial success at the box office and one of the biggest hits of 2000. It ran for 275 days in theatres  and collected  then became one of the highest grossing Malayalam film of the year.

Remakes
This film was remade in Telugu as Hanuman Junction (2001), in Kannada as Kodanda Rama (2002), in Tamil with the same name (2002) by the same director and in Bengali as Golmaal (2008) and in Bhojpuri as Sab Gol Maal Ha starring Ravi Kishan. Suresh Peters was retained as composer for the Telugu and Tamil remakes reusing the tunes from the film.

References

External links
 

2000s Malayalam-language films
2000 films
2000 action comedy films
Indian action comedy films
Films scored by Suresh Peters
Films shot in Tamil Nadu
Malayalam films remade in other languages
Films set in Tamil Nadu
2000 comedy films
Films directed by Rafi–Mecartin